"A Texas State of Mind" is a song written by Cliff Crofford, John Durrill and Snuff Garrett, and recorded by American country music artists David Frizzell and Shelly West.  It was released in August 1981 as the second single from the album Carryin' On the Family Names.  The song reached #9 on the Billboard Hot Country Singles & Tracks chart.

Chart performance

References

Songs about Texas
1981 singles
David Frizzell songs
Shelly West songs
Songs written by Snuff Garrett
Song recordings produced by Snuff Garrett
Warner Records singles
1981 songs